Djibril Guèye (born 19 November 1996) is a Senegalese football striker for Valmiera FC .

References

1996 births
Living people
Senegalese footballers
Senegal international footballers
US Ouakam players
AS Douanes (Senegal) players
Valmieras FK players
Association football forwards
Senegalese expatriate footballers
Expatriate footballers in Latvia
Senegalese expatriate sportspeople in Latvia